General Pinto is a town in Buenos Aires Province, Argentina. General Pinto may also refer to:

Francisco Antonio Pinto (1785–1858), Chilean Army general
Manuel Bulnes Pinto (1842–1899), Chilean Army general
Manuel Guillermo Pinto (1783–1853), Argentine Army general
Ottomar Pinto (1931–2007), Brazilian Air Force general
WAG Pinto (1924–2021), Indian Army lieutenant general